George Andrew Logan (13 August 1884 – 25 November 1953) was a member of the Queensland Legislative Assembly.

Biography
Logan was born at Rosewood, Queensland, the son of Whitmore Logan and his wife Harriett (née Josey). He was educated in Ipswich
and after leaving school worked as a farmer on the family estate at Mondure, near Murgon. After state politics, he worked for the Queensland Agricultural Bank.
 
On 18 October 1913 he married Ivy May Birtwhistle and together had a son and two daughters. Logan died in November 1953 in Kingaroy and his funeral proceeded from the Kingaroy Presbyterian Church to the Taabinga Cemetery.

Public career
Logan, a member of the Country Party, won the seat of Lockyer at the 1920 Queensland state election, defeating the sitting Labor member, Cuthbert Butler. He represented the electorate until he was defeated by the independent, Charles Jamieson in 1929.

References

Members of the Queensland Legislative Assembly
1884 births
1953 deaths
National Party of Australia members of the Parliament of Queensland
20th-century Australian politicians